Idrissa Traoré is the name of:

Idrissa Traoré (footballer, born 1943), Burkinabé footballer and football manager
Idrissa Traoré (footballer, born 1990), Malian footballer
Idrissa Traoré (footballer, born 1991), Malian footballer
Idrissa Traoré (referee), Malian football referee

See also
Drissa Traoré (born 1992), Ivorian footballer